Carla Venita Thomas (born December 21, 1942) is an American singer, who is often referred to as the Queen of Memphis Soul. Thomas is best known for her 1960s recordings for Atlantic and Stax including the hits "Gee Whiz (Look at His Eyes)" (1960), "B-A-B-Y" (1966) and "Tramp" (1967), a duet with Otis Redding. She is the daughter of Rufus Thomas.

Biography

Childhood
Thomas was born and raised in the Foote Homes Projects in Memphis, Tennessee, United States. Along with her siblings, Marvell and Vaneese, she was one of three musical children of Rufus and Lorene Thomas. Despite growing up in the projects, the Thomas family lived near the Palace Theater on Beale Street, as Rufus was the theater's Master of Ceremonies (MC) for their amateur shows. This access not only gave Thomas her first taste of the music world but it also provided a springboard for her transformation into the Queen of the Memphis Sound.

Teen Town Singers
In Memphis, the African-American-centered WDIA radio station sponsored a rotating musical group of high school students called the Teen Town Singers; notable alumni include Anita Louis and Isaac Hayes. Although the requirements to join the Teen Town Singers stated that the person should be of high school age, Thomas became a member in 1952 at the age of 10. She was able to sneak into their ranks thanks to the fact that her father Rufus was an on-air personality for the radio station. This opportunity with the Teen Town Singers did not come without its drawbacks though.

As a 10-year-old student, Thomas was responsible for not only attending classes and completing her schoolwork, but she also had to attend rehearsals on Wednesdays and Fridays after school and then perform at the station on Saturday. However, despite this grueling schedule, Thomas thoroughly enjoyed the experience. According to her, "It was a lot of fun, it really was." She remained with the Teen Town Singers up until the end of her senior year.

1960s

Thomas is best known for the work she completed for both Atlantic Records and most notably, Stax Records in the 1960s. Her first record, "'Cause I Love You" (1960), was a duet with her father, with brother Marvell on keyboards, that was released by Satellite Records, which eventually became Stax Records. Recorded when Thomas was still attending Hamilton High School in Memphis, the record drew enough local attention to catch the interest of Jerry Wexler of Atlantic Records.

He signed a deal with the owners of Satellite Records, Jim Stewart and Estelle Axton, to distribute "Cause I Love You" and thus paved the way for Thomas’ most famous single, "Gee Whiz (Look at His Eyes)", reaching number 10 on the pop chart and number 5 on the R&B chart. While she continued to have success on the R&B charts throughout the 1960s, her only other solo top 40 pop hit was "B-A-B-Y", reaching number 14 in 1966. Her duet, "Tramp", with Otis Redding reached number 26 on the pop chart the following year.and her album of duets with Otis Redding, King & Queen, was a number 18 hit in the UK Albums Chart.

"Gee Whiz (Look at His Eyes)"
Although this single would eventually chart within the Top 10 on the pop chart and within the top 5 on the R&B chart, it had an inauspicious beginning. Initially recorded at the Thomas family home, Rufus shopped the song to Vee-Jay Records in Chicago. Vee-Jay never followed through or actively pursued securing the distribution rights. Because of his belief in the song's potential, Rufus returned to Memphis and in the summer of 1960, Thomas would cut the teen love song that she wrote when she was only 15 years old. The song was released by Rufus and Carla in October 1960, to not much fanfare. However, by February 1961, thanks to a distribution deal made between Satellite and Atlantic Records, the song was being distributed nationally through Atlantic just as Thomas was in the midst of her first year at Tennessee A&I University in Nashville. The success of the single also propelled Thomas into the spotlight, as she performed on American Bandstand. According to Thomas, "The record was young-sounding, romantic and it expressed what a lot of people wanted to say at that age, but still, I was surprised at how well it did". Not only did this song provide a launching pad for Thomas' first album, but it also gave Stax Records national exposure and label recognition.

1970s–present
After her last Stax recording in 1971, Love Means..., and an appearance in Wattstax in 1972, Thomas slipped into relative obscurity when compared to her 1960s musical heyday. However, she was featured in a number of modern-day projects, notably including a 1994 compilation of her greatest hits, a 2002 live recording of a Memphis performance and the 2007 release Live at the Bohemian Caverns in Washington, D.C., a long lost live recording of Thomas in 1967. She would also occasionally tour during the 1980s and became heavily involved in the “Artists in the Schools” program that provided Memphis schoolchildren with access to successful artists. These workshops were organized to talk to teenagers about music, performing arts and drug abuse. In 1991, she appeared with her father at the Porretta Terme Soul Festival. In 1993, Thomas was awarded the prestigious Pioneer Award, along with such musical heavyweights as James Brown and Solomon Burke, from the Rhythm & Blues Foundation in honor of her career achievements. She was also featured in the 2003 documentary Only the Strong Survive, that was shown at the Cannes Film Festival and showcased important Stax recording artists. In 2021, Thomas featured on Valerie June's single "Call Me a Fool", which received a GRAMMY nomination for Best American Roots Song.

Artistry

Influences
Carla's biggest influence was her father, Rufus. Besides accompanying him during his 'MC' days at the Palace Theater, Rufus also encouraged and believed in his daughter's ability. According to Carla, “My dad probably discovered I could sing before I did”. He was also instrumental in setting the stage for her Teen Town Singers gig and for actively pursuing and promoting her breakthrough single, "Gee Whiz".

Musically, Thomas was inspired by Jackie Wilson and Brenda Lee.

Awards and nominations

Grammy Awards
 !! Ref.
|-
|rowspan="2" align="center"|
1968
| "The Queen Alone"
| Best Female R&B Vocal Performance 
| 
|
|}

Discography

Studio albums

Live albums
2002: Live in Memphis (Memphis International)
2007: Live at the Bohemian Caverns (Stax/Concord) recorded live May 27, 1967 in Washington, D.C.

Collaborations
1967: King & Queen (with Otis Redding) (Stax) – US #36, R&B #5

Compilations
1969: The Best of Carla Thomas (Stax) – US #190
1994: Gee Whiz: The Best of Carla Thomas (Rhino)
2004: Hidden Gems (Stax) previously unissued material recorded between 1960 and 1968

Singles

As featured artist

See also
Rufus and Carla
Marvell Thomas

Notes

References

External links

Stax Records fansite with Carla Thomas discography
Carla Thomas biography at Oldies.com
[ Carla Thomas] at Allmusic website

20th-century African-American women singers
1942 births
Living people
Musicians from Memphis, Tennessee
Atlantic Records artists
Stax Records artists
20th-century American singers
21st-century American singers
20th-century American women singers
21st-century American women singers
21st-century African-American women singers